In mathematics, the Redheffer star product is a binary operation on linear operators that arises in connection to solving coupled systems of linear equations. It was introduced by Raymond Redheffer in 1959, and has subsequently been widely adopted in computational methods for scattering matrices. Given two scattering matrices from different linear scatterers, the Redheffer star product yields the combined scattering matrix produced when some or all of the output channels of one scatterer are connected to inputs of another scatterer.

Definition 
Suppose  are the block matrices

and
,
whose blocks  have the same shape when
.
The Redheffer star product is then defined by:

,

assuming that  are invertible,
where  is an identity matrix conformable
This can be rewritten several ways making use of the so-called
push-through identity
.

Redheffer's definition extends beyond matrices to
linear operators on a Hilbert space .

.
where  is the direct sum.
However, the star product still makes sense as long as the transformations are compatible,
which is possible when 
and 
so that .

Properties

Existence 
 exists if and only if
 exists.

Thus when either exists, so does the Redheffer star product.

Identity 

Associativity 
The star product is associative, provided all of the relevant matrices are defined.

Thus .

Adjoint 
Provided either side exists, the adjoint of a Redheffer 

Inverse 
If  is the left matrix inverse of  such that
,  has a right inverse, and
 exists, then .

Similarly, if  is the left matrix inverse of  such
that ,  has a right inverse, and
 exists, then .

Also, if  and  has a left inverse
then .

The star inverse equals the matrix inverse and both can be computed with
block inversion as

.

Derivation from a linear system 

The star product arises from solving multiple linear systems of equations that share
variables in common.
Often, each linear system models the behavior of one subsystem in a physical process
and by connecting the multiple subsystems into a whole, one can eliminate variables
shared across subsystems in order to obtain the overall linear system.
For instance, let  be elements of a Hilbert space
 such that

and

giving the following  equations in  variables:

.

By substituting the first equation into the last we find:

.

By substituting the last equation into the first we find:

.

Eliminating    by substituting the two preceding equations
into those for  results in the Redheffer star product
being the matrix such that:

.

Connection to scattering matrices 

Many scattering processes take on a form that motivates a different
convention for the block structure of the linear system of a scattering matrix.
Typically a physical device that performs a linear transformation on inputs, such as
linear dielectric media on electromagnetic waves or in quantum mechanical scattering,
can be encapsulated as a system which interacts with the environment through various
ports, each of which accepts inputs and returns outputs. It is conventional to use a different notation for the Hilbert space, whose subscript
labels a port on the device.
Additionally, any element, has an additional superscript labeling the direction of travel (where + indicates moving from port i to i+1 and - indicates the reverse).

The equivalent notation for a Redheffer transformation,
,
used in the previous section is

.

The action of the S-matrix,
,
is defined with an additional flip compared to Redheffer's definition:

,

so 

.
Note that for in order for the off-diagonal identity matrices to be defined,
we require  be the same underlying Hilbert space.
(The subscript does not imply any difference, but is just a label for bookkeeping.)

The star product,
for two S-matrices, is given by

,

where 
so .

Properties 

Most of them follow from the correspondence
.
, the exchange operator, is also the S-matrix star identity defined below.
For the rest of this section,  are S-matrices.

Existence 

 exists when either

or

exist.

Identity 

The S-matrix star identity, is 
.
This means

Associativity 

Adjoint 

Inverse 

The matrix  that is the S-matrix star product inverse of
 in the sense that 
is  where  is the ordinary matrix inverse

Connection to transfer matrices 

Observe that a scattering matrix can be rewritten as a 
transfer matrix, with action
,
where

.

Here the subscripts relate the different directions of propagation at each port.
As a result, the star product of scattering matrices

,

is analogous to the following matrix multiplication of transfer matrices

,

where 
so .

Generalizations 
Redheffer generalized the star product in several ways:

Arbitrary bijections 
If there is a bijection  given by
 then an associative star product can be defined by:

.

The particular star product defined by Redheffer above is obtained from:

where .

3x3 star product 
A star product can also be defined for 3x3 matrices.

Applications to scattering matrices 
In physics, the Redheffer star product appears when constructing a total
scattering matrix from two or more subsystems.
If system  has a scattering matrix  and system
 has scattering matrix , then the combined system
 has scattering matrix .

Transmission line theory 
Many physical processes, including radiative transfer, neutron diffusion, circuit theory, and others are described by scattering processes whose formulation depends on the dimension of the process and the representation of the operators. For probabilistic problems, the scattering equation may appear in a Kolmogorov-type equation.

Electromagnetism 
The Redheffer star product can be used to solve for the propagation of electromagnetic fields in stratified, multilayered media. Each layer in the structure has its own scattering matrix and the total structure's scattering matrix can be described as the star product between all of the layers. A free software program that simulates electromagnetism in layered media is the
 Stanford Stratified Structure Solver.

Semiconductor interfaces 
Kinetic models of consecutive semiconductor interfaces can use a scattering matrix formulation to model the motion of electrons between the semiconductors.

Factorization on graphs 
In the analysis of Schrödinger operators on graphs, the scattering matrix of a graph can be obtained as a generalized star product of the scattering matrices corresponding to its subgraphs.

References 

Scattering theory
Scattering, absorption and radiative transfer
Hilbert space
Matrices
Mathematical physics